Ptychopseustis schmitzi is a moth in the family Crambidae. It is found in Namibia.

References

Cybalomiinae
Moths described in 2011